Shakiah Tungai (born 29 November 1996) is an Australian rugby league footballer who plays a  and  for the St George Illawarra Dragons in the NRL Women's Premiership. She is an Australian and New South Wales representative.

Background
Born in Wollongong, Tungai is of Indigenous Australian descent.

Growing up, she played soccer before switching to rugby league in 2017. In 2016, she won the Kyah Simon Player of the Tournament Medal at the National Indigenous Soccer Championships.

Playing career

2018
In June, while playing for the Avondale Greyhounds in the Illawarra Rugby League, Tungai represented NSW Country at the Women's National Championships. On 26 July, she signed with the St George Illawarra Dragons NRL Women's Premiership team.

In Round 1 of the 2018 NRL Women's season, she made her debut for the Dragons in a 4–30 loss to the Brisbane Broncos. She scored one try and kicked three goals during the season, finishing as the Dragons' top point scorer.

On 6 October, Tungai scored three tries and kicked three goals for the Prime Minister's XIII in a 40–4 win over Papua New Guinea.

2019
On 15 February, Tungai represented the Indigenous All Stars, scoring a try in their 4–8 loss to the Māori All Stars.

In May, she represented NSW Country at the Women's National Championships. On 21 June, Tungai made her State of Origin debut for New South Wales, scoring a try in their 14–4 win over Queensland.

In October, she represented Australia at the 2019 Rugby League World Cup 9s.

On 25 October, Tungai made her Test debut for Australia, scoring a try and kicking three goals in a 8–28 win over New Zealand.

2020

She injured her shoulder during the game, ruling her out for the remainder of the season.

References

External links
St George Illawarra Dragons profile

1996 births
Living people
Indigenous Australian rugby league players
Australian female rugby league players
Australia women's national rugby league team players
Rugby league wingers
Rugby league five-eighths
Rugby league fullbacks
St. George Illawarra Dragons (NRLW) players